Zhang Shunzi (Chinese: 张舜咨), a native Hangzhou, Zhejiang Province, was a famed 14th-century Chinese painter, calligrapher, and poet in the Yuan Dynasty. His birth and death years are unknown.

His style names were 'Shixie' and 'Shikui' (師夔), and his sobriquets were 'Lishan' (櫟山) and 'Zhe Zuiweng'. Zhang specialized in landscape and bamboo paintings, utilizing steady and bold brushstrokes. He also excelled in calligraphy, poetry and prose. He also served as county chief executive in Fujian Province in the Tianli era (1328-1330) of Emperor Wenzong of the Yuan Dynasty.

References
 Ming Deng: The Art Book of Chinese Paintings, 

Yuan dynasty landscape painters
Artists from Hangzhou
Year of death unknown
Yuan dynasty calligraphers
Yuan dynasty poets
Writers from Hangzhou
Year of birth unknown
Poets from Zhejiang
Painters from Zhejiang
14th-century Chinese calligraphers